Comdb2 is an open source, highly available clustered RDBMS developed by Bloomberg LP, built on optimistic concurrency control techniques. It provides multiple isolation levels, including Snapshot and Serializable Isolation. Read/Write transactions run on any node, with the client library transparently negotiating connections to lowest cost (latency) node which is available. Comdb2 implements queues for publisher-to-subscriber message delivery. Queues can be combined with table triggers for time-consistent log distribution.

Comdb2 supports the SQLite dialect of SQL with some modifications, and embeds the Lua scripting language. Comdb2 maintains a fork of Berkeley DB to provide the key–value database backend to SQLite.

Comdb2 architecture was described in detail in this 2016 technical paper.

See also 

 Comparison of relational database management systems
 Multi-master replication

Software that uses SQLite
Client-server database management systems
Free database management systems
Relational database management software for Linux
Software forks
Software using the Apache license